Zoé Magyarics (born 5 June 1998) is a Hungarian footballer who plays as a forward and has appeared for the Hungary women's national team.

Career
Magyarics has been capped for the Hungary national team, appearing for the team during the 2019 FIFA Women's World Cup qualifying cycle.

References

External links
 
 
 

1998 births
Living people
Hungarian women's footballers
Women's association football forwards
FC Südburgenland players
Clube de Albergaria players
Campeonato Nacional de Futebol Feminino players
Hungary women's international footballers
Hungarian expatriate footballers
Hungarian expatriate sportspeople in Portugal
Expatriate women's footballers in Portugal